Bundestag is a Berlin U-Bahn station located on the  line. The name of this station was changed in April 2006 from Reichstag to Bundestag to better reflect the physical location of the station and the function of nearby buildings.

History

Even though construction was completed in 1994, it took over a decade until the subway line U55 went into service in August 2009. In the intervening period, the partially completed station with its high ceiling and unusual architecture served as a location for cultural events like performances of the opera The Magic Flute and saw use as a film set for the Resident Evil film series, for Æon Flux and for Equilibrium.

From 2009 to early 2020, only the eastern side of the island platform was used, and only as a shuttle service between Hauptbahnhof and Brandenburger Tor. On 4 December 2020 the U5 extension opened, and from this date both sides were serviced by trains.

References

External links

U5 (Berlin U-Bahn) stations
Buildings and structures in Mitte
Railway stations in Germany opened in 2009